The Millionaire's Double is a 1917 silent American drama film directed by Harry Davenport, starring Lionel Barrymore and Evelyn Brent. The film is considered to be lost.

Cast
 Lionel Barrymore as Bide Bennington
 Evelyn Brent as Constance Brent
 Harry Northrup as Richard Glendon (as Harry S. Northrup)
 H. H. Pattee as James Brent
 John Smiley as Stevens
 John Raymond as 'Kid' Burns (as Jack Raymond)
 Louis Wolheim as Bob Holloway

See also
Lionel Barrymore filmography

References

External links 

lantern slide

1917 films
1917 drama films
Silent American drama films
American silent feature films
American black-and-white films
Films directed by Harry Davenport
Lost American films
Metro Pictures films
1917 lost films
Lost drama films
1910s American films